The Battle of Mount Gray was an engagement of the Apache Wars fought at the foothills of Gray Mountain (then known as Mount Gray) on April 7, 1864. A troop of the United States Army's California Column attacked a superior force of Chiricahua Apaches at their camp and routed them from the field.

Background
When the American Civil War began in 1861, Confederate Arizona was established so the Union raised a volunteer force of Californians to march through Arizona to capture the territory and to reinforce the Union army in the New Mexico Territory. During the 900 mile journey in 1862 and 1863, the California Column constructed or occupied several camps and forts, and when the column moved on, men were left behind to garrison them. One of these posts was Camp Mimbres. 

On March 15, 1864, Apaches raided a herd of livestock at Cow Springs. By March 27, the garrison of Camp Mimbres was informed of the attack so Captain James H. Whitlock organized an expedition to retrieve the stolen livestock. The expedition was made up of 46 men from the 5th California Infantry along with 10 men from the 1st California Cavalry. A few militia scouts also went along to be used as trackers. They headed towards Stein's Peak in the Sierra Bonita Mountains, and when they arrived, an Apache trail was spotted which led north into the San Simon Valley. After a few more days of marching, the Apache trail turned west, and it was followed to the base of Mount Gray within present day Hidalgo County, New Mexico.

Battle
At about 4:00 am on April 7, while marching through the foothills, Captain Whitlock noticed campfires in the distance, and he immediately assumed it to be an Apache camp. Quickly Whitlock advanced his troop to the camp where around 250 Apaches warriors were resting with the herd of livestock. Whitlock decided to separate his command into a few groups to surround the camp, they would then attack at first light. 

When the sun rose above the horizon, the American soldiers began their assault. Whitlock led the charge into the Apache camp, which was defended by the Chiricahua for over an hour before they retreated up the mountain. When the Americans were finally in control, they set fire to the wickiups and destroyed about 300 pounds of dried mescal, an Apache food source. While burning the mescal, 30 of the retreating Apaches turned around and attacked the soldiers to try to stop the destruction of their food, but they were driven off by effective volleys of rifle fire. Twenty-one Apaches were killed and left on the field, others were wounded but escaped. Forty-five horses and mules were captured. There were no American casualties.

Aftermath
The battle at Mount Gray was one of the more significant engagements fought between the California Column and the Apache. Similar to the earlier Battle of Apache Pass, the Californians were outnumbered but managed to defeat a larger force of hardened warriors.

Whitlock Valley and the Whitlock Mountains were later named after Captain Whitlock.

See also
 Skirmish in Doubtful Canyon

References

Conflicts in 1864
Battles of the California Column of the American Civil War
Union victories of the American Civil War
Battles involving the Apache
Battles involving the United States
Battles of the American Civil War in Arizona
Battles of the American Civil War in New Mexico
History of Hidalgo County, New Mexico
History of United States expansionism
Military history of the United States
Battles of the Trans-Mississippi Theater of the American Civil War
Apache Wars
April 1864 events